Inspector is a 1996 Russian comedy film directed by Sergey Gazarov. It is based on the play The Government Inspector by Nikolai Gogol.

Plot 
The film takes place in 19th-century Russia in a provincial criminal city, which the auditor decides to visit.

Cast 
 Nikita Mikhalkov as Anton Antonovich Skvoznik-Dmukhanovsky, the mayor
 Marina Neyolova as Anna Andreyevna, his wife
 Anna Mikhalkova as Mariya Antonovna, their daughter
 Zinoviy Gerdt as Luka Lukich Khlopov, the inspector of schools
 Oleg Yankovsky as Ammos Fedorovich Liapkin-Tiapkin, the judge
 Yevgeny Mironov as Khlestakov
 Armen Dzhigarkhanyan as Osip
 Pyotr Merkurev as Khristian Ivanovich Gibner, the district doctor
 Jan Kuzelka as Stepan Ilyich Ukhovertov, the chief of police
 Viktor Terelya as Derzhimorda, a policeman
 Idris Masgutov as The merchant, Abdulin
 Vladimir Ilyin

References

External links 
 

1996 films
1990s Russian-language films
Russian comedy films
1996 comedy films
Films based on The Government Inspector